The North Anna Nuclear Generating Station is a nuclear power plant on a  site in Louisa County, Virginia, in the Mid-Atlantic United States. The site is operated by Dominion Generation company and is jointly owned by the Dominion Virginia Power corporation (88.4%) and by the Old Dominion Electric Cooperative (11.6%).

The plant has two Westinghouse pressurized water reactors which went on-line in 1978 and 1980, respectively. Together the reactors generate 1.79 gigawatts of power, which is distributed mainly to the greater Richmond area and to Northern Virginia. In March 2003, the Nuclear Regulatory Commission approved 20 year license extensions for both Units 1 & 2.

An artificial lake, Lake Anna, was constructed on the North Anna River to provide a reservoir of water coolant for use with the nuclear plant.

Dominion Energy currently owns nuclear power plants in Virginia (North Anna, Surry), Connecticut (Millstone), South Carolina (Virgil C. Summer Nuclear Generating Station), and Wisconsin (Kewaunee). North Anna is similar in design and appearance to Surry Power Station.

Unit 3
Dominion obtained regulatory permission from the NRC to build and operate an additional unit at the site in 2017. The additional unit 3  would be an ESBWR. but the project was placed on hold later in 2017 before construction started.

Timeline

Dominion Nuclear North Anna, LLC submitted its application for an Early Site Permit (ESP) for the North Anna site on September 25, 2003. The NRC issued the ESP on November 27, 2007. On the same day, Dominion submitted an application for a Combined Construction and Operating License (COL) for a 1,520 MWe GE–Hitachi Economic Simplified Boiling Water Reactor (ESBWR), designated as North Anna Unit 3.

In 2009, having failed to agree on terms for an engineering construction and procurement deal with GE-Hitachi to actually build the reactor, Dominion issued a new request for proposals from reactor vendors. In 2010, Dominion announced that it had selected a 1,700 MWe, US-specific version of Mitsubishi Heavy Industries' (MHI) Advanced Pressurized Water Reactor (APWR) for the potential Unit 3. The proposed reactor brought public protest.  On August 7, 2008 six activists from the Peoples Alliance for Clean Energy were arrested at the North Anna Information Center for trespassing.

On October 29, 2010, Dominion president Tom Farrell told investors that Dominion had decided to slow its development of the proposed third reactor and wait until the combined construction permit-operating license (COL) was approved by the NRC before deciding to complete the project.  This approval was expected in early 2013 but issued in May 2017.

In 2013, it was announced that the ESBWR design would be pursued after all. Dominion stated that it would amend its COL application to reflect the ESBWR technology by the end of 2013 and expected to receive the COL "no earlier than late 2015." Dominion noted that it had not yet committed to building a new unit at North Anna. 
In October 2015, the Virginia Attorney-General's Office called for the abandonment of the project because of the cost burden on consumers.

On January 19, 2017, the Nuclear Regulatory Commission announced that its staff had completed its Final Safety Evaluation Report for a Combined License for the proposed reactor. The report concluded there are no safety aspects that would preclude issuing the license for the construction and operation of the new reactor. On May 31, 2017, the Nuclear Regulatory Commission announced that it had authorized the issuance of a Combined License for North Anna. The license granted permission to build and operate an ESBWR design at the site. The license contained conditions, including specific actions associated with the NRC's post-Fukushima requirements for Mitigation Strategies and Spent Fuel Pool Instrumentation, and a pre-startup schedule for post-Fukushima aspects of the new reactor's emergency preparedness plans and procedures.

On September 6, 2017, Dominion Energy paused development activities related to North Anna Unit 3, a decision that nuclear consultant Jim Little suggests may have been due to market conditions and competition from natural gas. Since the federal construction and operating license is valid for 20 years, Dominion Energy may opt to resume the project if economic prospects for the plant improve within that period.

Electricity production

Surrounding population

The 2010 U.S. population within  of North Anna was 21,396, an increase of 15.7 percent in a decade, according to an analysis of U.S. Census data for msnbc.com. The 2010 U.S. population within  was 1,912,015, an increase of 22.6 percent since 2000. Cities within  include Richmond ( to city center).

Seismic risk
The Nuclear Regulatory Commission's estimate of the risk each year of an earthquake intense enough to cause core damage to the reactor at North Anna was 1 in 22,727, according to an NRC study published in August 2010.

According to the USGS, two distinct seismic zones are located in Virginia. The Central Virginia Seismic Zone and the Giles County Seismic Zone. Both of these zones produce recurrent small earthquakes at least every few years. The North Anna Nuclear Generating Station, located 40 miles northwest of Richmond, lies within the Central Virginia Seismic Zone.

Known fault lines
During the construction of original nuclear reactors at North Anna, the utility learned of fault lines within the construction site of the proposed plants from its outside independent engineering firm, Stone & Webster, who the utility had hired to assess the proposed nuclear plant locations. The government fined the utility $32,000.00 for concealing this information.

According to the Huffington Post, this 1977 Justice Department memo "..focused on how the power company and federal regulatory officials went to efforts to not make public the knowledge of geologic faulting at North Anna. "[V]irtually the entire Office of Regulation of the [Nuclear Regulator Commission was]... well aware of the fault and determined not to take any immediate action," according to the memo. A government attorney, Bradford Whitman, did not recommend prosecution at the time, but the power company was eventually fined $32,500 for making false statements during the licensing process, according to the DOJ memo."

Incidents

The Nuclear Regulatory Commission extended the operating licenses of these plants for an additional 20 years in 2003.

2011 Virginia earthquake
At 1:51pm on August 23, 2011, a 5.8 magnitude earthquake occurred, centered south of Mineral, Virginia, eleven miles from the North Anna Nuclear Station. The Associated Press reported the quake "was felt as far north as Rhode Island, New York City and Martha's Vineyard, Mass." The reactors automatically shut down and, because of a loss of offsite power, four diesel generators started up to supply electricity to safety systems. The plant reported an "Alert" status, the second lowest level of four NRC emergency classifications, until 11:16am on August 24, 2011.  One of the generators suffered a coolant leak and stopped working.  A fifth standby generator was activated to replace the broken unit, which was repaired. Offsite power was restored later on August 23. Dominion also reported that the aftershocks did not affect the power plant.  Also on August 24, Dominion announced that it had ended the "Notice of Unusual Event", the least serious of the NRC emergency classifications, at the North Anna Power Station following inspection of equipment susceptible to seismic activity. However the plant was not restarted, pending NRC permission, until November.

After the Fukushima disaster had occurred six months prior, the Virginia earthquake prompted public fears of a similar nuclear accident at North Anna. According to local Virginia media station, WHSV, "The two North Anna reactors are among 27 in the eastern and central U.S. that may need upgrades because those plants are more likely to get hit with an earthquake larger than the one on which their design was based, according to a preliminary Nuclear Regulatory Commission review." Dominion has publicly stated that on-site, spent-nuclear-fuel long-term storage canisters shifted during the earthquake along with various building cracks, all while maintaining such damage does not represent unsafe operating conditions.

After more than two months of inspections, NRC permitted restart in November 2011. As of December 20, 2011, both units at North Anna Power Station have restarted and are operating at full power.

17 February 2012
On-site groundwater was found to contain a high level of tritium. The source of the tritium leak was unknown.

14 December 2016 
Some diesel generator fuel oil was believed to be released underground, the source of leakage was unknown.

Reactor data
The North Anna Nuclear Generating Station consists of two operational reactors, two originally planned units were cancelled. One additional unit is planned.

References

External links

Dominion's nuclear page
DoE Page

Energy infrastructure completed in 1978
Energy infrastructure completed in 1980
Louisa, Virginia
Nuclear power plants in Virginia
Nuclear power stations using Economic Simplified Boiling Water Reactors
Nuclear power stations with proposed reactors
Greater Richmond Region
Buildings and structures in Louisa County, Virginia
Nuclear power stations using pressurized water reactors
1978 establishments in Virginia